Karl Putzendopler (24 April 1898 – 11 January 1983) was an Austrian footballer who played for SK Rapid Wien and FC Basel. He played in the position as midfielder.

Football career
Putzendopler started his youth football and his football career by Rapid Wien. During the season 1919/20 he played a total of four games in the Austrian Championship.

During 1920 he and his elder brother Gustav Putzendopler moved to Switzerland to find work. Both had suffered due to the First World War, in fact Gustav had been held captured by the Russians for over 40 months. The brothers had completed an apprenticeship in Galvanoplastic and after the War both were unable to find an occupation in their home country. In Basel they both found work and both joined FC Basel and settled in quickly, they played regularly.

Between the years 1920 and 1927 Putzendopler played a total of 154 games for Basel scoring a total of 10 goals. 79 of these games were in the Swiss Serie A, three in the Swiss Cup and 72 were friendly games. He scored five goals in the domestic league, the other five were scored during the test games.

Putzendopler went on to become player-coach of Black Stars Basel. Under him the team won promotion to the 1930–31 Swiss Serie A, but winning only four points that season they suffered immediate relegation.

References

Sources
 Rotblau: Jahrbuch Saison 2017/2018. Publisher: FC Basel Marketing AG. 
 Die ersten 125 Jahre. Publisher: Josef Zindel im Friedrich Reinhardt Verlag, Basel. 
 Verein "Basler Fussballarchiv" Homepage

SK Rapid Wien players
Austrian footballers
FC Basel players
FC Black Stars Basel players
Association football midfielders
1898 births
1983 deaths